Connell Co-op College is a  Sixth Form College in the Beswick Hub development, Manchester. Run by the Co-op Academies Trust and formerly the Bright Futures Educational Trust (BFET) the college is located on the Etihad Campus training ground built by Manchester City Football Club as part of their redevelopment plans. The college is named after the Connell family, who were active in their local community in the 1880s and who created the church youth team which eventually morphed into the Premier League side. The college also serves the secondary purpose of educating members of their youth team, who will be allocated some places to complete their secondary education.

In addition to teaching the customary range of A-Level courses, the college also offers BTECs in Business, Science and Sport Science.

History
The sixth form college was one of three new free schools to be approved by Education Minister Michael Gove in July 2012, when the name of the educational facility was revealed to be Connell Co-op College, a tribute to the Connell family of Gorton, who founded Manchester City F.C. (in its first incarnation as a church youth team) in the latter part of the 19th century. The announcement also unveiled the link between the new college and Altrincham Grammar School for Girls, who proposed the initiative and had been asked to handle the management and recruitment of staff. Later the same year, Manchester City Football Club announced that the area around the college was to be part of a larger redevelopment, with commercial space as well as community leisure facilities.

The college took on its first classes in 2013 using a dedicated area in The East Manchester Academy, and its facilities opened in September 2014.

In July 2018, the college planned to leave Bright Futures Educational Trust (BFET) after government intervention in 2017. Education bosses have been looking for a suitable trust to take over the college. The Co-op Academies Trust has been chosen to run the college. The Co-op Academies Trust bosses say there are no plans to make any roles redundant at the college as a result of the re-brokerage

Notable alumni

Ellie Roebuck - Manchester City and England association football goalkeeper

References

External links
Official website

Manchester City F.C.
Sixth form colleges in Greater Manchester
Educational institutions established in 2013
2013 establishments in England